Bolbaite is a municipality in the comarca of Canal de Navarrés in the Valencian Community, Spain.

Demography

Monuments 
 Castillo de Bolbaite S. XVI
 Iglesia parroquial de San Francisco de Paula 1521.

References

Municipalities in the Province of Valencia
Canal de Navarrés